Krzykosy may refer to the following places:
Krzykosy, Gmina Dąbie in Greater Poland Voivodeship (west-central Poland)
Krzykosy, Gmina Kłodawa in Greater Poland Voivodeship (west-central Poland)
Krzykosy, Masovian Voivodeship (east-central Poland)
Krzykosy, Środa Wielkopolska County in Greater Poland Voivodeship (west-central Poland)
Krzykosy, Pomeranian Voivodeship (north Poland)